Ni ovde ni tamo is the second studio album from Serbian rock band Negative. It was recorded in 2001, and released in December 2002. The album introduced a new, heavier sound with a completely new, somewhat neo punk visual style of the band. The album helped the band gain popularity among alternative audiences. Public media informally proclaimed this album for their best one because of "harder" and "faster" melody then previous and last one.

Videos were shot for the songs "Bez promene" and "Kraj".

Track listing

External links
 Negative Official Page (Serbian and English)
 On: www.discogs.com

Negative (Serbian band) albums
2002 albums
PGP-RTS albums